Beijing Sports Radio is a radio station broadcasts at 102.5 FM in Beijing, China.  The station is part of the Radio Beijing Corporation.

The recent focus of this radio station has been the World Cup in Germany and the Beijing Olympic Games for 2008.

Before 2017 the Sports Radio also has an AM frequency 927 kHz, this frequency is now changed to air Beijing Youth Radio.

The sports that are broadcast often on this station are:
 F1
 Chess
 Volleyball
 Football (soccer)
 Tennis
 Ping pong (International Table Tennis Federation coverage in Chinese)
 Basketball
 China Soccer

See also
 CCTV-5 - Beijing Sports Television Channel

External links
 Beijing Tiyu Guangbo (Chinese)

Mandarin-language radio stations
Radio stations in China
Mass media in Beijing